Atomic Forest was an Indian psychedelic and hard rock band from Mumbai, active in the early-1970s. They recorded a single album, Obsession '77.

Background
Atomic Forest only recorded one album, which was not released until after the band had dissolved, in 1981.
Obsession 77 was re-released in January 2011 by Now-Again Records, a Los Angeles-based label. It caught the attention of collectors as it was the only psychedelic rock album that was ever produced in India.
The group also featured in Abhimanyu Kukreja's rockumentary, Evolution of Indian Rock. The band is also famously known for performing with English rock band Led Zeppelin.

Members
Madhukar Dhas joined the band in 1971. Also that year, Jazz musician Joe Alvarez played with the band at Blow-up in the Taj Mahal Palace Hotel.

Nandu Bhende, a former member of the group, died of a heart attack on 18 May 2014.

Discography

Further reading
 It's Psychedelic Baby! Magazine, 10 Sep 2012  - Atomic Forest interview with Madhukar Dhas (aka Madooo) - Interview made by Klemen Breznikar
 Rolling Stone, India, 21 Apr 2012 - Seventies Obsession: Mumbai’s Atomic Forest And The Original Hipster Era by Rahul Verma

References

External links
 Indian Bands Hub: Atomic Forest
 Discogs: Atomic Forest

Indian rock music
Indian rock music groups
Indian psychedelic rock music groups
Indian progressive rock groups
Indian musical groups
Culture of Mumbai
Now-Again Records artists